Tīruma (masculine: Tīrums) is a Latvian topographic surname, derived from the Latvian word for "field" (tīrums). Individuals with the surname include:
Elīza Cauce (born Tīruma in 1990), Latvian luger 
Maija Tīruma (born 1983), Latvian luger, sister of Elīza

Toponymic surnames
Latvian-language feminine surnames